The men's single sculls competition at the 1936 Summer Olympics took place at Grünau Regatta Course, near Berlin, Germany. The event was held from 11 to 14 August. There were 20 competitors from 20 nations, with each nation limited to a single boat in the event. The event was won by Gustav Schäfer of Germany, the nation's first victory in the event and first medal of any colour in the men's single sculls since 1908. Josef Hasenöhrl took silver, Austria's first medal in the event. Dan Barrow earned bronze, extending the United States' podium streak in the event to five Games; the Americans had taken a medal in each of the six times they competed in the event.

Background

This was the ninth appearance of the event. Rowing had been on the programme in 1896 but was cancelled due to bad weather. The single sculls has been held every time that rowing has been contested, beginning in 1900.

None of the 5 rowers from the 1932 Games returned. Australia's Cecil Pearce was the cousin of 1928 and 1932 gold medalist Bobby Pearce, who had turned professional after the 1932 Games (and thus was no longer eligible under the amateurism rules in place at the time). The pre-race favorite was Ernst Rufli of Switzerland, the two-time reigning Diamond Challenge Sculls champion. Humphrey Warren of Great Britain, Gustav Schäfer of Germany, and Jiří Zavřel of Czechoslovakia were also significant contenders.

Argentina, Brazil, Estonia, Norway, and Yugoslavia each made their debut in the event. Great Britain made its eighth appearance, most among nations, having missed only the 1904 Games in St. Louis.

Competition format

Despite having five more rowers than the previous record of 15 at the 1928 Games, the 1932 Games used only 4 rounds (to the 1928 tournament's 7). There were three main rounds and a repechage. The number of boats allowed in individual races was expanded from prior Games, with the final reaching six boats for the first time.

 Quarterfinals: There were four quarterfinal heats, each with 5 boats. The winner of each race advanced to the semifinals, while all other boats went to the repechage for a second chance. No rowers were eliminated.
 Repechage: There were again four heats, this time with 4 boats apiece. The winner of each joined the quarterfinal winners in the semifinals. The remaining 12 boats were eliminated.
 Semifinals: There were two heats, each with 4 boats (2 quarterfinal winners and 2 repechage winners apiece). The top 3 boats in each semifinal advanced to the final, with only the two 4th-place boats eliminated in this round.
 The final had 6 boats.

The course used the 2000 metres distance that became the Olympic standard in 1912.

Schedule

Results

Quarterfinals

The first rower in each heat advanced directly to the semifinals. The others competed again in the repechage for remaining spots in the semifinals.

Quarterfinal 1

Quarterfinal 2

Quarterfinal 3

Quarterfinal 4

Repechage

The winner of each race advanced to the semifinals; the other rowers were eliminated.

Repechage heat 1

Repechage heat 2

Repechage heat 3

Repechage 4

Semifinals

The first three rowers in each heat advanced to the final.

Semifinal 1

Semifinal 2

Final

Results summary

References

External links

Rowing936